is an Apollo near-Earth asteroid roughly  in diameter. The asteroid had a 0.41% chance (1 in 240) of impacting Earth on 2 November 2020 01:12 UT. The asteroid has a short 12.9 day observation arc. It was last observed on 16 November 2018 by the European Southern Observatory Very Large Telescope at apparent magnitude 26 pushing the telescope close to the limiting magnitude. 

Its diameter of 2–4 meters makes it approximately 100–1000 times less massive than the 20-meter Chelyabinsk meteor. An Earth-impact by this asteroid, assuming it is a common primitive chondrite, might rattle some windows after an airburst and/or drop pebble-sized meteorites on roof tops after dark flight.

Preliminarily results are that nothing was detected via infrasound or atmospheric flash monitors. The asteroid was not visually recovered.

Return 
 has a low 3.2° orbital inclination with respect to the ecliptic plane and an Earth-MOID of only 9700 km. Since the asteroid approached Earth in November 2018 and has a 2.00 year orbital period, the asteroid approached Earth again around 2 November 2020 (±3 days). Where Earth will be on a given date is known. However, given the short observation arc and the two years since it was seen at all, the location of the asteroid along its orbit was imprecisely known. 

The asteroid intersected Earth's orbit. A slight variation in the known orbit of the asteroid can cause it to be early (NEODyS solution), right on time (Sentry solution), or late (JPL solution). The Sentry Risk Table showed an estimated 1 in 240 chance of Earth impact on 2 November 2020 1:12 UT.

Impact line 
The line of variation (LOV) passed across the Pacific Ocean.

The asteroid came to opposition (opposite the Sun in the sky) at the end of May 2020 at an estimated apparent magnitude of ~31, and as a moving object was much too faint for any telescope to detect. Large ground-based observatories take 10 hours to image a magnitude ~28 object. The Hubble Space Telescope needs 3 weeks of exposure time to image magnitude 31 objects. The November 2020 Earth approach was expected be hidden by the glare of the Sun due to the asteroid's low solar elongation in that time.

It is not categorized as a potentially hazardous object given the estimated size is smaller than the threshold for potentially hazardous objects which are estimated at more than 140 meters in diameter.

See also

Notes

References

External links 
 List Of Apollo Minor Planets (by designation), Minor Planet Center
 
 
 IAWN: 2018 VP1 Geometry (2018 Approach)
 Table of Asteroids Next Closest Approaches to the Earth – Sormano Astronomical Observatory
 NEODyS (5 Nov 2018) with 1 day arc – hohmanntransfer
 Asteroid Hazards, Part 3: Finding the Path – YouTube video by the Minor Planet Center (26 August 2015)

Minor planet object articles (unnumbered)
Potential impact events caused by near-Earth objects
20201102
20181103